Société de transport de Laval (STL) is the public transit system in the city of Laval, Quebec, Canada. It was founded in June 1971 as the Commission de transport de la Ville de Laval (CTL). STL came about in 1984.

It serves the growing suburban areas of Laval, North of Montreal.

A proposal to convert some of STL's most heavily used routes to electric trolleybuses was studied in detail in 2009–2010, funded jointly by STL and  Hydro-Québec, but in autumn 2010 STL decided to postpone making a decision on trolleybuses until at least 2011, to allow further study of rechargeable electric buses first.

Routes
The STL runs 40 routes, including the former AMT's, now STL's 902 Express Route in Laval. Most bus routes end at metro stations Cartier and/or Montmorency of the Orange Line. All buses go to at least one metro, except for lines 66, 402 & 404. There is now one night route on the STL, route 2. In addition some of the daytime bus routes go up to 3:30 a.m. The STL also operates 6 collective taxi routes (T03 - along Saulnier Street, T07 - Rangs Haut-St-François & St-Elzéar sectors, T10 - along av. des Perron, T11 - in Fabreville, T12 - in NW Chomedey and T14 from Laval West to Saint Eustache).

Routes List

Taxi routes

Fares 
As of August 2020, a single fare is $3.50. The OPUS card is accepted, and can be used for single fares and passes. Travel on the Metro, even within Laval, requires payment of another fare to the STM. Between June 1 to Labour Day, a reduced fare of $1 (as of August 2020) is offered on Laval buses on days after a smog advisory is issued by Environment Canada.

Metro
The Montreal Metro is extended into Laval since 2007, and connects with STL at three stations:

 Cartier (Nearby intersections: Cartier Blvd/Laurentides Blvd,  Cartier Blvd/Major St): 21 routes, plus one night route
 De la Concorde (Nearby intersections: Concorde Blvd/Ampere Ave,  Concorde Blvd/Laval Blvd): 3 routes, plus one night route
 Montmorency (Nearby intersections: Jacques-Tétrault St/Lucien-Paiement St,  Jacques-Tétrault St/De l'Avenir Blvd): 15 routes, plus one night route

Commuter rail
STL also connects with Exo commuter trains at:

Saint-Jérôme Line 

 Bois-de-Boulogne (1 route)
 De la Concorde intermodal station (4 routes, including one night route)
 Vimont (2 routes)
 Sainte-Rose (3 routes)

Deux-Montagnes Line 

 Du Ruisseau in Montreal. (1 route)
 Bois-Franc in Montreal. (4 routes, including express 902)
 Sainte-Dorothée (6 routes, including express 903, and 2 train-buses)

Fleet
 Nova Bus LFS  
 New Flyer  (demo)
 denotes Wheelchair

Active fleet systems

 On Order (units)

Retired fleet systems

Proposed trolleybus system
In conjunction with Hydro-Québec and the provincial government, STL is considering the idea of constructing a trolleybus system in Laval.  A feasibility study began in spring 2009 and was completed in autumn 2010. Proponents of the idea, including Laval Mayor Gilles Vaillancourt, have said that replacing diesel buses with trolleybuses would bring a significant reduction in harmful pollutants but would be far less costly than a tramway (streetcar) alternative being favoured by Montreal and also be less disruptive to existing streets.

In discussing the Laval study, some provincial officials indicated they would like to see transport agencies in other major Quebec cities also consider installing trolleybus networks.  On completion of the study, the Laval transit authority decided to experiment with rechargeable battery-powered buses before making a decision on whether to proceed with trolleybuses. Among the points noted in the study's findings were that installing a trolleybus system would require a significant initial capital investment in infrastructure, but that trolleybuses are a technology known to be able to operate reliably in harsh winter temperatures, and it is uncertain whether other types of electric buses would be able to do so.

See also
Laval daycare bus crash

References

External links
 Société de transport de Laval website
 STL system map

Exo (public transit)
Laval
Laval
Transport in Laval, Quebec
1971 establishments in Quebec